SuperCoolNothing is the fourth studio album by 16volt, released on August 18, 1998 by Cargo and Re-Constriction Records. Two-thousand copies of the album were re-pressed by Dark City Music with new cover art and the first 100 copies signed by the band.

Reception

Don Kline of AllMusic called SuperCoolNothing "a menacing album full of whisper-to-scream verses, explosive choruses, and brooding electronic soundscapes." He award the album four out of five stars, concluding that "in a genre where imitation is often the easiest path to commercial success, Eric Powell continues to concoct his own unique blend of industrial rock, punk, and metal." Last Sigh Magazine credited the larger budget with helping 16volt develop as artists, saying "there is a variation in styles that usually comes with relaxed studio time; one of the perks of a major record deal." Dana Bove placed SuperCoolNothing at number ten for [[CMJ New Music Monthly|''CMJs]] top reader choices of the month.

Track listing

Personnel
Adapted from the SuperCoolNothing liner notes.16volt Mike Peoples – guitar, bass guitar
 Eric Powell – lead vocals, guitar, programming, production, recording, designAddition performers Joseph Bishara – programming, recording, production
 Krayge Tyler – guitar
 Chris Vrenna – live drumsProduction and design'''
 Michaelynn Dreiling – photography
 Andrew Garver – mastering
 Bill Kennedy – production, recording, mixing
 Dave Hancock – engineering
 JK Potter – photography
 Rafael Serrano – engineering
 Steve Tushar – recording

Release history

References

External links 
 
 SuperCoolNothing at Bandcamp
 

1998 albums
16volt albums
Metropolis Records albums